Melody Dawn Medeiros (born January 9, 1983) is an American former professional wrestler. She is best known for her time in Ohio Valley Wrestling, where she was a one-time Women's Champion.

Professional wrestling career

Independent circuit (2005–2008)
Medeiros made her wrestling debut in Memphis Wrestling on April 16, 2005, where she lost to Mickie James. On January 12, 2008, Medeiros, under the ring name Jezebel, made her debut for New Wave Pro Wrestling as she teamed with Kaos in a losing effort to Lady SoCal and SoCal Crazy in an intergender tag team match.

Ohio Valley Wrestling

Debut and Gothic Mayhem (2005–2006)
On the April 9, 2005, Medeiros, under the ring name Fuji Cakes, debuted for Ohio Valley Wrestling, where she teamed up with Scarlett in a losing effort to Serena Deeb and Trina. On the November 4, Cakes teamed up with Serena Deeb in a losing effort to Beth Phoenix and Shelly Martinez. Cakes then entered into a brief feud with both Phoenix and Martinez, losing singles matches to both on November 18 and 19, respectively. On March 18, 2006, Cakes teamed up with Deeb in a losing effort to Cherry Pie and Roni Jonah.

On July 26, 2006, Mederios made her televised OVW debut as Melody, losing to Serena Deeb. Soon after her name change, she allied with Jonah and Discord (later renamed to Johnny Punch) to form Gothic Mayhem, a stable of heavy metal punk rockers with Melody and Jonah serving as groupies. Gothic Mayhem teamed up with Jenny Mae in a losing effort to Beth Phoenix, ODB and Venus in a six-woman tag team match. Eventually the group was joined by Pat Buck, who formed a tag team with Punch, as well as Tony Braddock, who served as their enforcer.

The Solid Gold Diva (2007–2009)
Beginning in the middle of 2007, Melody overhauled her appearance by adopting golden attire, straightening and bleaching her hair platinum blond, and gaining breast implants while proclaiming herself "The Solid Gold Diva". On October 29, 2007, Melody debuted for Derby City Wrestling, OVW's subsidiary promotion, and lost a Bra and Panties match to Josie. On December 12, 2007, Punch turned on Melody by challenging her to a match in order to end his losing streak. Although uneasy about competing, Melody accepted the challenge and went on to defeat Punch, handing him his ninety-ninth consecutive loss. Afterwards, Melody left Gothic Mayhem and turned face as she began to compete in OVW's women's division.

After leaving Gothic Mayhem, Melody joined the Mobile Homers (Adam Revolver, Ted McNaler and Dewey) in early 2008 while continuing to wrestle on her own. In mid-2008, the Homers would be joined by McNaler's kayfabe younger brother Tommy. On the November 15, Melody defeated Josie, Reggie, and then-champion Serena Deeb to win the Women's Championship. Soon after winning the title, she made her first successful title defense by defeating Reggie. Beginning in 2009, she would continue to have successful title defenses against the likes of Serena, first via disqualification and then in a steel cage match, and Bailey Parker. On June 20, Melody became the longest reigning Women's Champion in OVW's history, as her title reign surpassed the previous record of 219 days set by Katie Lea's two title reigns. On August 12, 2009, Melody lost the Women's Title to Epiphany, ending her reign at 273 days in what turned out to be her final match in OVW.

Vyper Fight League (2009–2010)
On April 24, 2009, OVW founder and owner Danny Davis founded the Vyper Fight League, a mixed martial arts organization. As a result of OVW being the organization's parent company, Medeiros became one of the VFL's "Vyxens" until the organization folded in 2010.

Independent circuit (2010, 2011)
Following her departure from OVW, Medeiros took a hiatus before returning to wrestling on June 19, 2010 to compete in a three ring, 159-man battle royal at the Alternative Wrestling Show and National Wrestling Alliance joint event Bart's Birthday Bash, which was ultimately won by Scorpio Sky. After another hiatus, Medeiros returned to wrestling on March 26, 2011, under the ring name Jezebel, where she won a 10-person tag team match alongside Duke, Kaos, Ray Rosas and Robby Phoenix by defeating Andre Machievski, Joey Barone, Nightmare Azteca, Ryan Kidd and SoCal Crazy.

Personal life
Medeiros graduated from The Art Institute of Seattle in 2003 with a degree in graphic design.

Championships and accomplishments
Ohio Valley Wrestling
OVW Women's Championship (1 time)
Miss OVW (2008)

References

External links
Online World of Wrestling profile

{{OVW Women's Championship}|state=collapsed}}

1983 births
21st-century professional wrestlers
American female professional wrestlers
Living people
Professional wrestling managers and valets
Professional wrestlers from California
Sportspeople from Louisville, Kentucky
OVW Women's Champions